The 1975 Louisiana gubernatorial election resulted in the re-election of Edwin Edwards to his second term as governor of Louisiana. This was the last time that a Democrat was re-elected to a second consecutive term as governor of Louisiana until 2019, 44 years later, when John Bel Edwards (no relation) won re-election.

This was the last gubernatorial election held before the adoption of the Louisiana primary in 1978.

Background
Elections in Louisiana—with the exception of U.S. presidential elections—follow a variation of the open primary system. Candidates of any and all parties are listed on one ballot; voters need not limit themselves to the candidates of one party. Unless one candidate takes more than 50% of the vote in the first round, a run-off election is then held between the top two candidates, who may in fact be members of the same party. In this election – the first gubernatorial election held under the state's new open primary law – the first round of voting was held on November 1, 1975.

Although no runoff was needed, because of the way the new election law was written, an unopposed runoff was held on December 13. Edwards received 430,095 votes in it, according to figures recorded by the Louisiana Secretary of State's office. The Republicans did not field a candidate for the election. The law was later rewritten to where the unopposed runoff was not required if a candidate won an outright majority in the primary. This happened in the 1983 election, when Edwards won a third non-consecutive term over Republican incumbent David C. Treen.

Candidates
 Edwin Edwards, incumbent Governor of Louisiana since 1972
 Bob Jones, State Senator from Lake Charles and son of former Governor Sam H. Jones
 Ken Lewis, perennial candidate
Wade O. Martin Jr., Louisiana Secretary of State since 1946
 Cecilia M. Pizzo
 Addison Roswell Thompson, perennial candidate

Results

References

Sources 
 State of Louisiana.  Primary and General Election Returns, 1975.

1975
Louisiana
Gubernatorial